Constriction is a method used by various snake species to kill or subdue their prey. Although some species of venomous and mildly venomous snakes do use constriction to subdue their prey, most snakes which use constriction lack venom. The snake initially strikes at its prey and holds on, pulling the prey into its coils or, in the case of very large prey, pulling itself onto the prey. The snake will then wrap one or two loops around the prey, forming a constriction coil. The snake will monitor the prey's heartbeat to ascertain when it is dead.  This can be a physically demanding and potentially dangerous procedure for the snake, as it accelerates its metabolism up to seven times and leaves it vulnerable to attack by another predator.

Contrary to myth, the snake does not crush the prey, or break its bones. However, several natural observations exist involving wild anacondas that show broken bones in large prey.  Also, contrary to previous belief, the snake does not cause suffocation by constricting the victim;  instead, a study of death caused by boa constrictors showed that constriction "shuts off" blood flow (and therefore oxygen) needed by vital organs such as the heart and brain, leading to unconsciousness within seconds and cardiac arrest shortly thereafter. Further, multiple species of snakes have been shown to constrict with pressures higher than those shown to induce cardiac arrest.  In conjunction with observations of oral and nasal hemorrhaging in prey, constriction pressures are also thought to interfere with neural processing by forcing blood towards the brain.  In other words, constriction can work by different mechanisms at varying pressures.  It likely interferes with breathing at low pressures,  can interrupt blood flow and overwhelm the prey's usual blood pressure and circulation at moderate pressures, and can interfere with neural processing and damage tissues at high pressures.  

During constriction events where the prey's heart is impeded, arterial pressure drops while venous pressure increases, and blood vessels begin to close. The heart does not have enough strength to pump against the pressure and blood flow stops. Internal organs with high metabolic rates, including the brain, liver, and heart, begin to stop functioning and die due to ischemia, a loss of oxygen and glucose. There is evidence that boa constrictors have more difficulty killing ectotherms—animals like lizards and snakes that rely on external heat to regulate their body temperatures. A boa constrictor was observed attacking a spinytail iguana for an hour, and the iguana survived.

As this is comparatively recent research (2015), it is possible that other constrictors kill in other ways. It had previously been accepted that constrictors used their body to hold the prey tight and prevent the prey from drawing air into its lungs, resulting in death from asphyxia, or that the pressure of constriction causes a rise in the pressure in the prey's body cavity greater than the heart can counter, resulting in immediate cardiac arrest;  data from earlier studies had also indicated that snakes can exert enough pressure for these to be plausible.

Certain groups of snakes have characteristic patterns of constriction, including the number of coils they use and the orientation of the coils.

Venomous snakes that also use constriction include the genus Clelia (ophiophagous South American mildly venomous rear-fanged colubrids which use constriction to subdue snakes including pit vipers), the western terrestrial garter snake (North American colubrid which is an inefficient constrictor and, like most Thamnophis garter snakes, mildly venomous), some species of Boiga snakes (Asian and Australian rear-fanged colubrids) including the brown tree snake (Boiga irregularis), some species of Australian elapids (including some of the venomous Pseudonaja brown snakes and one Australian coral snake Simoselaps), and a few Australian colubrids.

See also
 Boa constrictor
 Pythonidae

References

External links
 "World's Deadliest: Anaconda Devours World's Largest Rodent"

Snakes
Predation